Weatherford Independent School District is a public school district based in Weatherford, Texas (USA).

In addition to Weatherford, the district serves most of Hudson Oaks as well as portions of Willow Park and Annetta North.

In 2009, the school district was rated "recognized" by the Texas Education Agency.

Schools

High schools
Grades 9-12
Weatherford High School
Weatherford High School Ninth Grade Center

Middle schools
Grades 6-8
Shirley A. Hall Middle School
Joe M. Tison Middle School

Elementary schools
Grades K-5
Stephen F. Austin Elementary School
Raymond E. Curtis Elementary School
Bose Ikard Elementary School
Mary Martin Elementary School
Grades PK-5
David Crockett Elementary School
Juan Seguin Elementary School
Bill W. Wright Elementary School

Students

Academics

Students in Weatherford typically perform close to local region and statewide averages on standardized tests.  In 2015-2016 State of Texas Assessments of Academic Readiness (STAAR) results, 77% of students in Lake Worth ISD met Level II Satisfactory standards, compared with 77% in Region 11 and 75% in the state of Texas. The average SAT score of the class of 2015 was 1478, and the average ACT score was 21.3.

Demographics
In the 2015-2016 school year, the school district had a total of 7,840 students, ranging from early childhood education and pre-kindergarten through grade 12. The class of 2015 included 520 graduates; the annual drop-out rate across grades 9-12 was 0.0%.

As of the 2015-2016 school year, the ethnic distribution of the school district was 69.1% White, 24.5% Hispanic, 2.4% African American, 0.6% Asian, 0.5% American Indian, 0.0% Pacific Islander, and 2.9% from two or more races. Economically disadvantaged students made up 41.7% of the student body.

References

External links
Weatherford ISD

School districts in Parker County, Texas